Yeom Dong-yeol (Korean: 염동열; Hanja: 廉東烈; born 28 February 1961) is a South Korean politician and a current member of the National Assembly.

Early life and education 
Yeom was born in Doam-myeon, Pyeongchang-gun, Gangwon, South Korea on February 28, 1961. He graduated from Catholic Kwandong University with a degree in business administration.

Political career 
Yeom ran for representative of Gangwon Pyeongchang-gun and Yeongwol-gun in 2000 as a member of the Democratic Party, but lost to Kim Yong-hak of the Grand National Party.

Yeom ran for the same district in 2010 during by-elections but lost to Choi Jong-won of the Democratic Party.

In 2012, Yeom ran for the same district once again and was elected with 56.61% of the vote. He was pro-Park Geun-hye.

In 2016, Yeom's constituency was reorganized, despite that he won his constituency again in the 2016 South Korean legislative election.

He assumed the position of Secretary-General of the Liberty Korea Party on June 7, 2017.

He has announced that he will not be running in the 2020 South Korean legislative election.

On March 19, 2020, he and three other United Future Party members including Won Yoo-chul defected to the Future Korea Party.

He became the second Secretary-General of the Future Korea Party on March 21, 2020; succeeding Cho Hun-hyun.

Personal life 
Yeom married his wife, Han In-sook in 2003. They have two sons.

References 

1961 births
Living people
Members of the National Assembly (South Korea)